The 461st Flight Test Squadron is a United States Air Force squadron, assigned to the 412th Operations Group of Air Force Materiel Command, and is stationed at Edwards Air Force Base, California. The Squadron performs flight testing on the Lockheed Martin F-35 Lightning II.

The squadron's origins can be traced to the 361st Fighter Squadron, which flew combat in the European Theater of Operations, where it won a Distinguished Unit Citation before inactivating in 1945.

In 1985, the 361st Squadron was consolidated with the 461st Tactical Fighter Training Squadron.  The 461st had been activated in 1956 as the 461st Fighter-Day Squadron and served as a fighter unit in Europe until 1959.  It served as a training unit in Arizona starting in 1977.  The consolidated unit was inactivated in 1994, but was activated again in its current role in 2006.

Overview
The 461st Squadron tests aircraft systems at Edwards Air Force Base.

History

World War II
The squadron was organized and trained in the Northeast United States by First Air Force. During training it was a part of the northeast air defense, linking it to the New York and Boston Fighter Wings.

The 461st ran operations in preparation for the invasion of the European continent; they supported the landings in Normandy and the Allied drive across France and Germany. The squadron flew Republic P-47 Thunderbolts until they were replaced by North American P-51 Mustangs in November 1944. Aircraft of the 461st were identified by a magenta/blue diamond pattern around their cowling, carrying fuselage code QI.

From October 1943 until January 1944 the squadron operated as escort for Boeing B-17 Flying Fortress and Consolidated B-24 Liberator bombers that attacked industrial areas, missile sites, airfields, and communications.

Fighters from the 461st engaged primarily in bombing and strafing missions after 3 January 1944. Its targets included U-boat installations, barges, shipyards, aerodromes, hangars, marshaling yards, locomotives, trucks, oil facilities, flak towers, and radar stations. The 461st bombed and strafed the Arnhem, Netherlands area on 17, 18, and 23 September 1944 in order to neutralize enemy gun emplacements that were providing support to Allied ground forces during Operation Market-Garden.  In early 1945, the squadron's Mustangs clashed with German Messerschmitt Me 262 jet aircraft. The squadron flew its last combat mission, escorting B-17's dropping propaganda leaflets, on 7 May 1945.

The squadron remained in the United Kingdom during the balance of 1945, most personnel were demobilized and returned to the United States, with aircraft being sent to storage facilities in the UK.  The squadron was inactivated at Camp Myles Standish, Massachusetts on 10 November 1945.

Fighter operations in Europe

The 461st Fighter-Day Squadron was reactivated at Hahn Air Base, West Germany during February 1956, equipped with North American F-100 Super Sabres, being one of the first United States Air Forces Europe squadrons equipped with supersonic jet aircraft. The aircraft carried three black diagonal stripes on the tail.  Between 1956 and 1959, it conducted air superiority and general support missions as directed by Twelfth Air Force and, later by United States Air Forces in Europe.  It also maintained and trained forces for a limited fighter-bomber capability with basic air-to-air weapons.  The squadron was inactivated in August 1959.

Fighter training

The 461st was reactivated on 1 July 1977 at Luke Air Force Base, Arizona as a Replacement Training Unit (RTU) for the McDonnell Douglas F-15A Eagle, conducting fighter aircraft aircrew training for pilots.  The improved F-15C/D model arrived in 1982 for pilot training. In 1985 the Air Force consolidated the 461st Tactical Fighter Training Squadron with the World War II 361st Fighter Squadron, giving the squadron a combat heritage and lineage.

In the late 1980s, the F-15E Strike Eagle dual-role version of the F-15C arrived at Luke.  The 461st received the first new F‑15E on 12 April 1988.   The squadron continued to gain aircraft and the first F‑15E transition class graduated on 24 February 1989. Once qualified, the crews were reassigned to an operational squadron at the 4th Tactical Fighter Wing at Seymour Johnson Air Force Base, North Carolina. It was inactivated on 5 August 1994 as part of the phase-down of F-15 training at Luke.

Flight test
The squadron was reactivated at Edwards Air Force Base, California, in 2006.  Its mission is flight testing aircraft, primarily the F-35 Lightning II.

On 22 January 2019, a Boeing KC-46 Pegasus from the 418th Flight Test Squadron made connection with an F-35A from the 461st Flight Test Squadron.  It is the first time the KC-46 connected with a fifth-generation jet fighter.

Lineage
 361st Fighter Squadron
 Constituted as the 361st Fighter Squadron on 8 December 1942
 Activated on 12 December 1942
 Redesignated 361st Fighter Squadron, Single Engine on 20 September 1944
 Inactivated on 11 November 1945
 Consolidated with the 461st Tactical Fighter Training Squadron as the 461st Tactical Fighter Training Squadron on 19 September 1985

 461st Flight Test Squadron
 Constituted as the 461st Fighter-Day Squadron on 30 December 1955
 Activated on 8 February 1956
 Redesignated 461st Tactical Fighter Squadron on 8 July 1958
 Inactivated on 1 August 1959
 Redesignated 461st Tactical Fighter Training Squadron on 15 July 1976
 Activated on 1 July 1977
 Consolidated with the 361st Fighter Squadron on 19 September 1985
 Redesignated 461st Fighter Squadron on 1 November 1991
 Inactivated on 5 August 1994
 Redesignated 461st Flight Test Squadron''' on 23 October 2006
 Activated on 27 October 2006

Assignments
 356th Fighter Group, 12 December 1942 – 10 November 1945
 Army Service Forces, Port of Embarkation, 10–11 November 1945
 36th Fighter-Day Group, 8 February 1956 (attached to 86th Fighter-Interceptor Group until 2 May 1956, 36th Fighter-Day Wing after 1 October 1956)
 36th Fighter-Day Wing (later 36th Tactical Fighter Wing), 8 December 1957 – 1 August 1959
 58th Tactical Training Wing, 1 July 1977
 405th Tactical Training Wing, 29 August 1979
 58th Operations Group, 1 October 1991
 56th Operations Group, 1 April – 5 August 1994
 412th Operations Group, 27 October 2006 – present

Stations
 Westover Field, Massachusetts, 12 December 1942
 New Haven Army Air Field, Connecticut, 2 March 1943
 Bradley Field, Connecticut, 19 April 1943
 Suffolk County Army Air Field, New York, 8 June 1943
 Grenier Field, New Hampshire, 4 July 1943
 Camp Myles Standish, Massachusetts, 15–20 August 1943
 RAF Goxhill (AAF-345), England, 27 August 1943
 RAF Martlesham Heath (AAF-369), England, 9 October 1943 – 28 October 1945
 Camp Myles Standish, Massachusetts, 10–11 November 1945
 Landstuhl Air Base, West Germany, 8 February 1956
 Hahn Air Base, West Germany, 2 May 1956 – 1 August 1959
 Luke Air Force Base, Arizona, 1 July 1977 – 5 August 1994
 Edwards Air Force Base, California, 27 October 2006 – present

Aircraft

 Republic P-47 Thunderbolt (1943–1944)
 North American P-51 Mustang (1944–1945)
 North American F-86 Sabre (1956)
 North American F-100 Super Sabre (1956–1959)
 Lockheed T-33 Shooting Star (1956)
 McDonnell Douglas F-15A Eagle (1977–1988)
 McDonnel Douglas F-15E Strike Eagle (1988–1994)
 Lockheed Martin F-35 Lightning II (2006–present)

See also

 List of United States Air Force test squadrons

References

Notes

Citations

Bibliography

 
 
 

 Further reading
 Martin, Patrick. Tail Code: The Complete History of USAF Tactical Aircraft Tail Code Markings. Schiffer Publishing, 1994. .

External links
Captain John Pershing Perrin DFC, 1943/44 361st Fighter Squadron Ace – who died so others might live
Wartime air crash. Perrin Memorial
John Perrin, Class of '40 The Rutgers Oral History Archives

0461
Military units and formations in California
1955 establishments in California